Braslav may refer to:
Braslav, Duke of Lower Pannonia ( 882–896), a Frankish Slavic governor
Braslaw, a town in Belarus

See also
Bratslav
Bratislav
Breslau (disambiguation)